Image: 1983-1998 is a compilation of electronic music by Japanese artist Susumu Yokota. It was released in 1998 on Skintone in Japan, and on September 13, 1999 by The Leaf Label in the United Kingdom.

The album includes tracks created between 1983 and 1998 and originally on Yokota's own Skintone label. The album runs semi-chronologically, the first five tracks being from the years 1983 and 1984, whilst the remainder consists of tracks made in 1997 and 1998. The CD version also includes a fold-out of visual art created by Yokota in 1987 and 1988.

In the United Kingdom, the album was released both on CD and on vinyl. Tracks one through seven are included on side A, while the latter six tracks are on side B.

"Nisemono no Uta" samples "Salad Days" by Young Marble Giants.

Track listing

Susumu Yokota albums
1999 compilation albums